Swahili settlements of the East African coast date from as early as the first century CE when eastern Bantu people on the east coast of Africa began adopting the Swahili language and culture and founded settlements along the coast and islands. Below is a list of Swahili settlements founded between 800 CE to 1900 CE.

Northern coast, Tanzania 

 Manza
 Toten Island
 Tanga
Yambe Island
Tongoni
Mnarani
Mushembo

Pangani
Bweni Dogo
Ras Kikokwe
Kipumbwe
Kiungani
Sange
Kisikimto
Ushongo
Mkwaja
Bimbini
Mafui

Uzimia
Buyuni
Saadani
Utondwe
Winde
Mkadini
Bagamoyo
 Kaole

Southern Coast, Tanzania 

 Mbegani
 Mbweni
 Ukutani
 Kunduchi
 Msasani
 Dar es Salaam
 Mjimwema
 Mbuamaji
 Kimbiji
 Mbuamaji
 Kigunda
 Funza
 Jino Baya

 Sala
 Kutani
 Bandarini
 Kisiju
 Kwale Island
 Koma Island
 Kisimani, Mafia
 Kua Juani
 Mwanamkuru
 Mbutu Bandarini
 Ras Dege
 Kanyegwa Mfunguni
 Ras Kutani

 Jambe Juani
 Chole
 Jibondo
 Kivinje
 Mtitimira
 Kilwa Kisiwani
 Songo Mnara
 Mivinja
 Mkuje
 Kikurwi
 Pemba Mnazi
 Buyuni Mbuyuni

 Mwanakiwambi
 Sanje Majoma
 Sanje ya Kati
 Majumbe
 Kisawere
 Lindi
 Mchinga
 Ngao Mwanya
 Mikindani
 Msemo
 Kiruti Island
 Boza Island
 Ngevu
 Mkungu

Zanzibar Island, Tanzania 

 Zanzibar Town
 Unguja Ukuu
 Kizimkazi
 Mbweni, Zanzibar
 Dunga
 Mkokotoni
 Shangani
 Pwani Deburi
 Beit El Ras
 Chuini
 Kidichi
 Kizimbani

 Chukwani
 Maharubi
 Mbweni
 Tumbatu
 Makunduchi
 Mvuleni
 Chwaka
 Nungwi
 Fukuchani
 Jongowe
 Shungi
 Uroa

Pemba Island, Tanzania 

 Shengeju 
 Ndagoni
 Chake
 Pujini Ruins
 Chwaka
 Mandani
 Kichokochwe Ruins
 Verani
 Mkia wa Ng'ombe
 Kimeliani
 Mduuni
 Shumba
 Msuka Mjini Ruins
 Makongwe
 Kiwani
 Jambangome

 Mtambwe Kuu
 Msuka
 Shamiani
 Chambani
 Kiungoni
 Mtangani
 Mkama Ndume
 Tumbe
 Finga
 Kojani
 Wingwi
 Kiuyu
 Vitongoje
 Mitondoni
 Ras Mkumbuu Ruins

South coast, Kenya 

 Ngomeni
 Mambrui
 Malindi
 Mgangani
 Gedi
 Watamu
 Kilepwa
 Kilifi
 Mnarani, Kenya

 Kitoka
 Takaungu
 Kinuni
 Jumba la Mtwana
 Mtwapa
 Kongowea, Mombasa
 Mvita, Mombasa
 Kilindini, Mombasa
 Tiwi

 Diani
 Ukunda
 Gazi
 Munge
 Kifundi
 Wassini
 Vanga
 Vumba Kuu

North coast, Kenya 

 Ishakani
 Kiunga
 Mwana Mtama
 Omwe
 Mambore
 Uchi Juu
 Shee Umuro
 Shee Jafari
 Rubu

 Simambaya
 Sendeni
 Mvindeni
 Kiwayu
 Ndau
 Faza
 Kizingitini
 Tundwa

 Atu
 Siyu
 Kitau
 Shanga
 Wange
 Dondo
 Bui
 Pate
 Magogoni
 Kipungani
 Manda

 Takwa
 Shela
 Lamu
 Matondoni
 Mkunumbi
 Uziwa
 Witu
 Mea
 Al Famau
 Bunta la Mwana
 Shaka
 Ungwana
 Kipini
 Kau
 Manda

References

Further reading
 
 
 
 
 
 

Swahili city-states